Adoboli is a West African surname. Notable people with the surname include:

Eugene Koffi Adoboli (born 1934), Togolese politician
Kweku Adoboli (born 1980), Ghanaian investment manager and former stock trader

Surnames of African origin